This is a list of Nunavut territorial electoral districts. In total there are 22 electoral districts in Nunavut spread over three administrative regions. Each district elects one member to the Legislative Assembly of Nunavut in a first past the post system. Unlike some other parts of Canada, such as Ontario, a new by-election must be held in a riding if the original result ended in a tie. There are no political parties in Nunavut, each candidate runs as an independent and the territory operates by consensus government.

List of districts

Former districts

References

 
Electoral
Nunavut territorial